John Maffitt may refer to:
Reverend John Newland Maffitt (preacher), Methodist itinerant preacher in the United States
Commander John Newland Maffitt (privateer), officer in the United States Navy and Confederate States Navy, nicknamed the "Prince of Privateers", son of the above